Jafarabad-e Akhavan (also Romanized as Ja‘farābād-e Akhavān) is a village in Behnampazuki-ye Jonubi Rural District, in the Central District of Varamin County, Tehran Province, Iran. At the 2006 census, its population was 1,649, in 404 families.

References 

Populated places in Varamin County